Keshavarz Rural District is in Keshavarz District of Shahin Dezh County, West Azerbaijan province, Iran. At the National Census of 2006, its population was 11,179 in 2,516 households. There were 10,658 inhabitants in 2,865 households at the following census of 2011. At the most recent census of 2016, the population of the rural district was 10,153 in 3,098 households. The largest of its 24 villages was Ahmadabad, with 1,639 people.

References 

Shahin Dezh County

Rural Districts of West Azerbaijan Province

Populated places in West Azerbaijan Province

Populated places in Shahin Dezh County